is the eleventh single by Japanese band Antic Cafe. The title track is featured on the album Magnya Carta. The song peaked at No. 26 on the Japanese singles chart.

Track listing
Disc one
 "Snow Scene" (スノーシーン)
 "Bokura no Poppopo!" (僕らのポッポポー！)

Disc two (DVD)
 "Smile Ichiban Ii Onna (“Yagai de Nyappy” Live Ver.)" (スマイル一番 イイ♀("野外でニャッピー"Live Ver.))

References

An Cafe songs
2006 singles
2006 songs
Loop Ash Records singles
Songs written by Kanon (bassist)